Bill Lloyd was an American soccer coach who was briefly head coach of the United States men's national soccer team. He was at the helm for three games in 1937, losing all three.

External links
List of U.S. national team coaches

American soccer coaches
American people of Welsh descent
United States men's national soccer team managers
Year of birth unknown
Year of death unknown